Filippo Volandri was the defending champion, but lost in the first round to Juan Lizariturry.

Albert Ramos won the title, defeating Pere Riba in the final, 6–3, 7–5.

Seeds

Draw

Finals

Top half

Bottom half

References
 Main Draw
 Qualifying Draw

Aspria Tennis Cup - Trofeo CDI - Singles
2014 - Singles